Fouad Qandil (1944 – 3 June 2015) was an Egyptian novelist. He was born in Beha in eastern Egypt and studied philosophy at Cairo University. He was a key figure in Egypt's literary generation of the 1960s. He published more than 40 books, including 18 novels and 12 short story collections. Among his many awards are the Naguib Mahfouz Prize for Best Novel, the State Excellency Award, the State Appreciation Award, and the Tayyib Salih Prize.

References

Egyptian novelists
1944 births
2015 deaths
Cairo University alumni
Egyptian children's writers